Garces Memorial Traffic Circle, informally known as Garces Circle or just The Circle, is a traffic circle in Bakersfield, California. The traffic circle is located at the intersection of Chester Avenue, Golden State Avenue (State Route 204) and 30th Street. An overpass stands over the circle, allowing through traffic on Golden State Avenue to bypass it.

The traffic circle honors Spanish Franciscan friar Francisco Garcés, who served as a missionary and explorer in the colonial Viceroyalty of New Spain. A California Historical Landmark, it was approximately on this site where Garcés visited an Indian rancheria on May 7, 1776.

History

The Circle was originally built as a part of US 99 in approximately 1932. A large 1939 sculpture of Father Francisco Garcés by John Palo-Kangas rests inside the circle. 

At  of inner diameter, the Garces Memorial Traffic Circle is a smaller sibling of the similar  inner-diameter 1930 Long Beach Traffic Circle located in Long Beach.

Landmark
California Historical Landmark reads:
NO. 277 GARCÉS CIRCLE - This is the approximate site of the Indian rancheria visited by Franciscan friar Padre Francisco Garcés on May 7, 1776. Padre Garcés named this spot San Miguel de los Noches por el Santa Príncipe.

See also
 California Historical Landmarks in Kern County
California Historical Landmark

Sources 

 Historical Tour of US 99 - The Golden State Highway
 Father Garces Audio Slideshow - Bakersfield Californian

Transportation in Bakersfield, California
Garces Memorial Circle
Landmarks in Bakersfield, California
1932 establishments in California
Infrastructure completed in 1932
California Historical Landmarks